Biological thermodynamics is the quantitative study of the energy transductions that occur in or between living organisms, structures, and cells and of the nature and function of the chemical processes underlying these transductions. Biological thermodynamics may address the question of whether the benefit associated with any particular phenotypic trait is worth the energy investment it requires.

History
German-British medical doctor and biochemist Hans Krebs' 1957 book Energy Transformations in Living Matter (written with Hans Kornberg) was the first major publication on the thermodynamics of biochemical reactions. In addition, the appendix contained the first-ever published thermodynamic tables, written by Kenneth Burton, to contain equilibrium constants and Gibbs free energy of formations for chemical species, able to calculate biochemical reactions that had not yet occurred.

Non-equilibrium thermodynamics has been applied for explaining how biological organisms can develop from disorder. Ilya Prigogine developed methods for the thermodynamic treatment of such systems. He called these systems dissipative systems, because they are formed and maintained by the dissipative processes that exchange energy between the system and its environment, and because they disappear if that exchange ceases. It may be said that they live in symbiosis with their environment. Energy transformations in biology are dependent primarily on photosynthesis.  The total energy captured by photosynthesis in green plants from the solar radiation is about 2 x 1023 joules of energy per year. Annual energy captured by photosynthesis in green plants is about 4% of the total sunlight energy that reaches Earth. The energy transformations in biological communities surrounding hydrothermal vents are exceptions; they oxidize sulfur, obtaining their energy via chemosynthesis rather than photosynthesis.

The focus of thermodynamics in biology

The field of biological thermodynamics is focused on principles of chemical thermodynamics in biology and biochemistry.  Principles covered include the first law of thermodynamics, the second law of thermodynamics, Gibbs free energy, statistical thermodynamics, reaction kinetics, and on hypotheses of the origin of life.  Presently, biological thermodynamics concerns itself with the study of internal biochemical dynamics as: ATP hydrolysis, protein stability, DNA binding, membrane diffusion, enzyme kinetics, and other such essential energy controlled pathways. In terms of thermodynamics, the amount of energy capable of doing work during a chemical reaction is measured quantitatively by the change in the Gibbs free energy. The physical biologist Alfred Lotka attempted to unify the change in the Gibbs free energy with evolutionary theory.

Energy transformation in biological systems 

The sun is the primary source of energy for living organisms. Some living organisms like plants need sunlight directly while other organisms like humans can acquire energy from the sun indirectly. There is however evidence that some bacteria can thrive in harsh environments like Antarctica as evidence by the blue-green algae beneath thick layers of ice in the lakes. No matter what the type of living species, all living organisms must capture, transduce, store, and use energy to live.

The relationship between the energy of the incoming sunlight and its wavelength  or frequency  is given by

where h is the Planck constant (6.63x10−34Js) and c is the speed of light (2.998x108 m/s). Plants trap this energy from the sunlight and undergo photosynthesis, effectively converting solar energy into chemical energy. To transfer the energy once again, animals will feed on plants and use the energy of digested plant materials to create biological macromolecules.

Thermodynamic Theory of Evolution 
The biological evolution may be explained through a thermodynamic theory. The two laws of thermodynamics are used to frame the biological theory behind evolution. The first law of thermodynamics states that energy can not be created or destroyed. No life can create energy but must obtain it through its environment. The second law of thermodynamics states that energy can be transformed and that occurs everyday in lifeforms. As organisms take energy from their environment they can transform it into useful energy. This is the foundation of tropic [Should this be "trophic"?] dynamics.

The general example is that the open system can be defined as any ecosystem that moves toward maximizing the dispersal of energy. All things strive towards maximum entropy production, which in terms of evolution, occurs in changes in DNA to increase biodiversity. Thus, diversity can be linked to the second law of thermodynamics. Diversity can also be argued to be a diffusion process that diffuses toward a dynamic equilibrium to maximize entropy. Therefore, thermodynamics can explain the direction and rate of evolution along with the direction and rate of succession.

Examples

First Law of Thermodynamics 
The First Law of Thermodynamics is a statement of the conservation of energy; though it can be changed from one form to another, energy can be neither created nor destroyed. From the first law, a principle called Hess's Law arises. Hess's Law states that the heat absorbed or evolved in a given reaction must always be constant and independent of the manner in which the reaction takes place. Although some intermediate reactions may be endothermic and others may be exothermic, the total heat exchange is equal to the heat exchange had the process occurred directly. This principle is the basis for the calorimeter, a device used to determine the amount of heat in a chemical reaction. Since all incoming energy enters the body as food and is ultimately oxidized, the total heat production may be estimated by measuring the heat produced by the oxidation of food in a calorimeter. This heat is expressed in kilocalories, which are the common unit of food energy found on nutrition labels.

Second Law of Thermodynamics 
The Second Law of Thermodynamics is concerned primarily with whether or not a given process is possible. The Second Law states that no natural process can occur unless it is accompanied by an increase in the entropy of the universe. Stated differently, an isolated system will always tend to disorder. Living organisms are often mistakenly believed to defy the Second Law because they are able to increase their level of organization. To correct this misinterpretation, one must refer simply to the definition of systems and boundaries. A living organism is an open system, able to exchange both matter and energy with its environment. For example, a human being takes in food, breaks it down into its components, and then uses those to build up cells, tissues, ligaments, etc. This process increases order in the body, and thus decreases entropy. However, humans also 1) conduct heat to clothing and other objects they are in contact with, 2) generate convection due to differences in body temperature and the environment, 3) radiate heat into space, 4) consume energy-containing substances (i.e., food), and 5) eliminate waste (e.g., carbon dioxide, water, and other components of breath, urine, feces, sweat, etc.). When taking all these processes into account, the total entropy of the greater system (i.e., the human and her/his environment) increases. When the human ceases to live, none of these processes (1-5) take place, and any interruption in the processes (esp. 4 or 5) will quickly lead to morbidity and/or mortality.

Gibbs Free Energy 
In biological systems, in general energy and entropy change together. Therefore, it is necessary to be able to define a state function that accounts for these changes simultaneously. This state function is the Gibbs Free Energy, G.

G = H − TS

where: 
 H is the enthalpy (SI unit: joule)
 T is the temperature (SI unit: kelvin)
 S is the entropy (SI unit: joule per kelvin)
The change in Gibbs Free Energy can be used to determine whether a given chemical reaction can occur spontaneously. If ∆G is negative, the reaction can occur spontaneously. Likewise, if ∆G is positive, the reaction is nonspontaneous. Chemical reactions can be “coupled” together if they share intermediates. In this case, the overall Gibbs Free Energy change is simply the sum of the ∆G values for each reaction. Therefore, an unfavorable reaction (positive ∆G1) can be driven by a second, highly favorable reaction (negative ∆G2 where the magnitude of ∆G2 > magnitude of ∆G1). For example, the reaction of glucose with fructose to form sucrose has a ∆G value of +5.5 kcal/mole. Therefore, this reaction will not occur spontaneously. The breakdown of ATP to form ADP and inorganic phosphate has a ∆G value of -7.3 kcal/mole. These two reactions can be coupled together, so that glucose binds with ATP to form glucose-1-phosphate and ADP. The glucose-1-phosphate is then able to bond with fructose yielding sucrose and inorganic phosphate. The ∆G value of the coupled reaction is -1.8 kcal/mole, indicating that the reaction will occur spontaneously. This principle of coupling reactions to alter the change in Gibbs Free Energy is the basic principle behind all enzymatic action in biological organisms.

See also

 Bioenergetics
 Ecological energetics
 Harris-Benedict Equations
 Stress (biology)

References

Closer Listening
Haynie, D. (2001). Biological Thermodynamics (textbook). Cambridge: Cambridge University Press.
Lehninger, A., Nelson, D., & Cox, M. (1993). Principles of Biochemistry, 2nd Ed (textbook). New York: Worth Publishers.
Alberty, Robert, A. (2006). Biochemical Thermodynamics: Applications of Mathematica (Methods of Biochemical Analysis), Wiley-Interscience.

External links
Cellular Thermodynamics - Wolfe, J. (2002), Encyclopedia of Life Sciences.
Bioenergetics

Thermodynamics
Thermodynamics